Geoff Hammond is an English former professional footballer who played as a defender.

In 1970, Hammond began his career with Ipswich Town. He transferred to Manchester City in 1976 for two seasons, then moved to Charlton Athletic for one season, before ending his career with the Connecticut Bicentennials of the North American Soccer League in 1977.

Hammond's daughter, Kelly, married Ipswich Town goalkeeper Richard Wright, in 2000.

References

NASL Stats NASL stats

1950 births
Living people
Charlton Athletic F.C. players
Connecticut Bicentennials players
English footballers
English expatriate footballers
Ipswich Town F.C. players
Manchester City F.C. players
North American Soccer League (1968–1984) players
Association football defenders
English expatriate sportspeople in the United States
Expatriate soccer players in the United States